Cyanorus singularis is a small proarticulatan, closely related to Spriggina and Marywadea. Its two largest pairs of appendages are located on the anterior part of the body. The anterior part of the body was most likely not segmented. The axial structure of it combines features of the Vendia species and Dickinsonia species. It was found in the Upper Vendian of the White Sea area, Arkhangel'sk Region. It is a White Sea Ediacaran fossil and it became extinct during the Late Precambrian.

Notes

References

Ediacaran life
Sprigginidae